Primi Townsend (
is a British actress.

She was a regular cast member on the sitcom Lame Ducks and is also remembered for her role in the Doctor Who serial The Pirate Planet.

Other TV credits include: Z-Cars, Minder, 1990, Blake's 7 and Bergerac and a major role in TV series written by Ted Whitehead "Worlds End" 13 eps on BBC 2

She recently appeared recounting her appearance in Doctor Who in a documentary on the season 16 story The Pirate Planet, which was released in 2007.

Primi appeared in many stage shows, both West End and regional, as well as touring overseas.  She played the part of "Rita" in Educating Rita opposite Gareth Thomas, who had portrayed the character Blake in Blake's 7 (although they did not appear in the series together).

Television

Film

References

External links
 

British television actresses
Living people